Deshdrohi ( Traitor) is a 2008 Indian Hindi-language action thriller film directed by Jagdish A. Sharma. It was scripted and produced by KRK, who also appeared in the lead role alongside Manoj Tiwari, Hrishitaa Bhatt, Gracy Singh and Zulfi Syed. Released on 14 November 2008, it was subject to negative reviews from critics, and is considered as one of the worst Bollywood films.

Plot

The themes of the film consists of politics, prostitution, pimping, and corruption. At the start of the film, a man named Raja Yadav (Kamaal Rashid Khan) arrives in Mumbai from Uttar Pradesh searching for a watchman's job, after leaving his father and neighbour, Neha, both behind in his village in Uttar Pradesh.

In Mumbai, Raja meets Shekhar, a gangster, who works as a watchman, and Sonia, who works for a drug dealer named Baba Kadam. At one point, Raja helps Sonia escape from an attack by a group working for another drug dealer called Rajan Nayak, Baba Kadam's rival. The two eventually fall in love.

After realising that living in Mumbai is difficult for North Indians, Raja petitions Shrivastav, a North Indian politician who exploits common people for his political career, for help. The drug mafia of Mumbai city is assisted by politicians, and the media want to reveal the corruption prevalent in the city.

Due to his involvement, Raja is marked for death by Rajan Nayak, who contracts a police inspector to kill both him and Sonia. However, he fails and is killed. The police pursue Raja and Sonia, who are also hiding from Rajan Nayak. Raja attempts to obtain help from Shrivastav to no avail, and even Sonia's boss, Baba Kadam, abandons the pair.

Pushed to the limit, Raja resolves to kill all involved, in which he is helped by Inspector Rohit Raghav, the new husband of Raja's village sweetheart.

Cast
Kamaal Rashid Khan as Raja Yadav
Gracy Singh as Sonia Patil
Aman Verma as Minister Shrivastav
Hrishitaa Bhatt as Neha Rohit Raghav (Few lines as Mona Ghosh Shetty)
Manoj Tiwari as Shekhar
Kader Khan as Abdul Bhai
Mukesh Tiwari as Rajan Naik, a corrupt politician
Zulfi Syed as Inspector Rohit Raghav
Ranjeet as Raja's father
Avtar Gill as Raja's grandfather
Aryan Vaid in cameo appearance in a song
Yashpal Sharma as Baba Kadam
Raza Murad as Chief Minister of Maharashtra
Kim Sharma as Herself
Nirmal Pandey as Deputy Chief Minister Nagesh Kulkarni
Shiva Rindani as Encounter specialist Rajesh Sharma
Arun Bakshi as Shrivastav's P.A.
 Anil Nagrath as Deshmukh, the informer

Music

Controversy
There were accusations that the movie was attempting to profit off of the 2008 attacks on North Indians in Maharashtra. The head of the Mumbai office of the Central Board of Film Certification opined that the movie has scenes that were derogatory to a particular community. Maharashtra Navnirman Sena expressed their protests against the movie. The Mumbai police served a notice for a special screening to find any objectionable content that might trigger unrest. Due to the protests and problems with exhibitors, the release date of the movie was postponed by a week from the original date of 7 November. The movie was released on 14 November, except in Maharashtra, where it was banned by the state government for 60 days under the Bombay Cinema Regulation Act. The producers of the film petitioned the Bombay High Court to lift the ban on the movie. After a two-month ban it was released on 23 January 2009 in Maharashtra.

Reviews
The film received negative reviews overall.

See also
List of films banned in India

References

External links
 

2008 films
2000s Hindi-language films
2008 action thriller films
Indian action thriller films
2008 directorial debut films
Films scored by Nikhil-Vinay
Films about race and ethnicity
Fictional portrayals of the Maharashtra Police
Films about politicians
Indian political thriller films
Film controversies in India
Film censorship in India